A&W Root Beer is an American brand of root beer that was founded in 1919 by Roy W. Allen and primarily available in the United States and Canada. Allen partnered with Frank Wright in 1922, creating the A&W brand and inspiring a chain of A&W Restaurants founded that year. Originally, A&W Root Beer sold for five cents.

The rights to the A&W brand (except in Canada) are owned by Keurig Dr Pepper, which in turn licenses the brand to the U.S.-based A&W Restaurant chain. A&W Root Beer products are distributed via various U.S. bottlers. A&W Food Services of Canada, which is independent of both Keurig Dr Pepper and the U.S. restaurant chain, is responsible for the restaurants and marketing of root beer products in Canada, with retail products bottled and distributed by the Coca-Cola Company. The U.S. variant is also sold as an import drink in Southeast Asia and Italy (where A&W has restaurants), as well as in Australia, Chile and other countries.

History 
Roy W. Allen opened a roadside root beer stand in Lodi, California in 1919, using a formula that he had purchased from a pharmacist. He soon opened stands in Stockton, as well as five stands in nearby Sacramento - where "tray boys" pioneered drive-in curbside service. In 1920 Allen partnered with Frank Wright, birthing the A&W brand name.

Allen bought Wright out, obtained a trademark, and began selling restaurant franchises - creating one of the first restaurant chains in the United States. Franchise owners could use the A&W name and logo and purchased concentrated root beer syrup from Allen. There was no common menu, architecture, or set of procedures, and some chose to also sell food. By 1933 there were 170 A&W franchises.

Franchises struggled with labor shortages and sugar rationing during World War II, but following the war GI loans helped, in part, the number of A&W outlets to triple. The proliferation of the automobile and the mobility it offered resulted in more than 450 A&W Root Beer stands operating by 1950. That year Allen retired and sold the business to Nebraskan Gene Hurtz, who formed the A&W Root Beer Company. The first A&W Root Beer outlet in Canada opened in 1956.

By 1960 the number of A&W restaurants swelled to more than 2,000.

In 1963 the company was sold to the J. Hungerford Smith Company, which had produced Allen's concentrate since 1921. That year the first overseas A&W restaurant opened its doors in Guam. In 1966 Hungerford was sold to the United Fruit Company, which merged with AMK Corporation in 1970 to form the United Brands Company.

In 1971 United Brands formed a wholly owned subsidiary, A&W Distributing Co., to retail its root beer. After test runs in Arizona and California the products were distributed nationally, including sugar-free, low-sodium, and caffeine-free versions. In 1974, A&W introduced "The Great Root Bear," a mascot that served as a goodwill ambassador for the brand.

In the late 1970s A&W Restaurants was formed to manage restaurant franchising. It was bought in 1982 by A. Alfred Taubman.

The bear and its associated jingle became the basis of a long-running Canadian advertising campaign. The mascot was so successful that it was eventually adopted by the American A&W chain as well.

In 1986 A&W Cream Soda and A&W Diet Cream Soda were introduced and distributed nationally, followed in 1987 by the reformulation of A&W Sugar-Free as Diet A&W.

In October 1993 A&W Beverages was folded into Cadbury Beverages. It spun off its U.S. beverages business as Dr Pepper Snapple Group in 2008.

In July 2017 A&W Canada reformulated its root beer, dropping high fructose corn syrup and some flavors from the recipe, substituting cane sugar, sarsaparilla root, licorice, birch bark and anise. A&W Canada launched the new formula by declaring Free Root Beer Day, serving free root beer at all locations on July 22, 2017.

In November 2020 Diet A&W was rebranded as A&W Zero Sugar.

Brands 

 A&W Sugar-Free was introduced in 1974 and reformulated as Diet A&W in 1987. In 2020, it was rebranded with the name A&W Zero Sugar.
 A&W Cream Soda and A&W Diet Cream Soda were introduced in 1986.
A&W Floats and Sunkist Floats were introduced in 2008.
A&W TEN, a low-calorie root beer, began appearing in American supermarkets in the spring of 2013.

Promotions and contests 
 Through eBay, A&W and Jim Belushi offered a trip to Los Angeles with a VIP pass to the "A&W Ultimate All-American Cookout and Concert" at the House of Blues.
In celebration of its 100th anniversary, A&W offered a free two-liter bottle of its root beer in exchange for taking the Family Fun Pledge, which asked participants to be "technology-free for one hour every Friday night this summer."

The Great Root Bear 

The Great Root Bear, also called Rooty, became the mascot for A&W Root Beer in 1973.

In a long-running television advertising campaign for the Canadian A&W chain, his theme was a tuba-driven jingle entitled "Ba-Dum, Ba-Dum". The jingle was released as a single by Attic Records in Canada. It was credited to "Major Ursus", a play on the constellation name Ursa Major, which means "great bear". The famous Canadian composer and B.C. Hall of Fame enshrinee Robert Buckley helped compose the song.

In the late 1990s, the Great Root Bear's role as mascot was reduced for the restaurant chain, ultimately replaced by "The Burger Family", although it still appeared in various capacities for the restaurants and on A&W Root Beer cases in Canada.

In late 2011, the new ownership of A&W began using the mascot again, particularly in A&W's online presence.

A&W Restaurants 

Shortly after Allen bought out Wright's portion of the business he began franchising the product. His profits came from a small franchise fee and sales of concentrate. There was no standard food menu for franchises until 1978. By 1960 the company had 2,000 stores.

In 1989 A&W made an agreement with Minnesota-based chain Carousel Snack Bars to convert that chain's 200 locations (mostly kiosks in shopping malls) to "A&W Hot Dogs & More". Some A&W Hot Dogs & More locations are in operation today.

Many A&W locations that opened in the U.S. during the Yum! Brands ownership years (2002–2011) were co-branded with Yum!'s other chains—Long John Silver's, Taco Bell, Pizza Hut or KFC.

As of December 2011 A&W was under new ownership and its world headquarters was moved back to Lexington, Kentucky. Since then, in the United States and Southeast Asia, A&W has been a franchisee-owned company.

References

Bibliography

External links 
 A&W's root beer site
 The History of Root Beer
 Root Beer Reviews and info

Root beer
Products introduced in 1919
Keurig Dr Pepper brands
1919 establishments in California